Yeison Fernando Mejía Zelaya (born 18 January 1998) is a Honduran footballer who plays as a midfielder for Sporting Kansas City II.

Career
For the 2019 season, Mejía signed for Guatemalan second division side Sansare after playing for the youth academy of Olimpia, Honduras' most successful club.

In 2020, he signed for Real España in the Honduran top flight.

References

External links
 Yeison Mejía at Soccerway

Honduran footballers
Living people
1998 births
Association football midfielders
Association football wingers
Association football forwards
People from Colón Department (Honduras)
C.D. Real Sociedad players
Real C.D. España players